Ippommatsu Station may be:
 Ippommatsu Station (Saitama), a station on the Tobu Ogose Line in Japan
 Ippommatsu Station (Fukuoka), a station on the JR Hitahikosan Line in Japan